Sarder Patel Medical College is a medical college recognized by the Medical Council Of India located in the city Bikaner of the Indian state Rajasthan.

History
The college was established in 1959 and was Rajasthan's second medical college. It was inaugurated by the former Prime Minister of India Pandit Jawaharlal Nehru and approved by MCI.

Overview

The college is fully funded by the government of Rajasthan. The college has 250 seats for MBBS and 63 for the post grad students. and 18 in diploma, two seats in DM cardiology and two seats in MCh Urology.

The following hospitals are attached to Sarder Patel Medical College: 
 P.B.M. Male Hospital 
 P.B.M. Female Hospital 
 G.G.J. TB Hospital 
 Eye Department
 Pediatrics Department 
 Haldiram Moolchand Govt. Center for Cardiovascular Research
 Acharya Tulsi Regional Cancer Treatment and Research Center 
 Trauma Centre
 Geriatric Research Centre
 Diabetic Research Centre

Accommodation
There are separate hostels for students, four for undergraduate boys, one for girls, one for interns and two for postgraduate students.

References

External links
Sardar Official website
 Sardar Patel Medical College on government of Rajasthan website

Colleges in Bikaner
Medical colleges in Rajasthan
Educational institutions established in 1959
1959 establishments in Rajasthan
Affiliates of Rajasthan University of Health Sciences